Maria Tipo (born 23 December 1931) is an Italian pianist.

Biography
Tipo was born in Naples. She was taught originally by her mother, Ersilia Cavallo, who was a pupil of Ferruccio Busoni. She went on to study under Alfredo Casella and Guido Agosti.

At only seventeen, she won the Geneva international piano competition. Since then, she has performed widely and made a considerable number of recordings.

Maria Tipo's first appearance in North America in the late 1950s, where she played over 300 concerts, caused her to be nicknamed the "Neapolitan Horowitz". Her first recording, an LP of 12 Scarlatti sonatas, which she recorded in a mere 4 hours in 1955, was hailed by Newsweek magazine as the most spectacular record of the year.

Her recordings of Bach's Goldberg Variations and of sonatas by Domenico Scarlatti have been awarded the "Diapason d’Or". She has also championed the music of Muzio Clementi both in concert and on disc. Her stature has tended to be higher among her fellow-pianists than with the general public. Martha Argerich, in an interview with Rai Radio 3, referred to her as "sensational".

She is a pianist of considerable strength and virtuosity. The critic Piero Rattalino recalls her playing as a teenager: "Her agility was incredible, and her precision greater than the volcanic Martha Argerich". He classes her with the "tradition of Italian interpreters that begins with Toscanini and includes Zecchi, Benedetti Michelangeli, Pollini, Accardo, Muti, Abbado: interpreters who remain masters of their emotions and achieve the effect they want on the public." He concludes: "Maria Tipo is a knight errant, always ready to do battle for her ideal, even when this ideal takes the form of the Devil. [Her] ideal is beauty. There are other ways to make music, but this is certainly not the least of them."

Tipo also is a dedicated teacher, giving master classes at the Gubbio Festival and the Scuola di Musica di Fiesole, and has served as a professor at the Conservatories of Geneva, Bolzano and Florence. Among her students are the pianists Frank Lévy, Nelson Goerner, Fabio Bidini, Andrea Lucchesini, Pietro De Maria, Giovanni Nesi, Alessandro Marangoni, Alessandra Ammara, Angelo Arciglione, Domenico Piccichè, and many others.

References

1931 births
Italian classical pianists
Living people
Musicians from Naples
Prize-winners of the Queen Elisabeth Competition
Women classical pianists
Italian women pianists
21st-century classical pianists
21st-century women pianists